The Setsoto Stadium is a multi-purpose stadium in Maseru, Lesotho. It is currently used mostly for football matches.  The stadium holds 20,000. It is currently the home ground of the Lesotho national football team. It has been renovated and enlarged in 2010–2011.

In August 2017, the stadium served as the venue for the wedding ceremony between former Lesotho Prime Minister Tom Thabane and Maesiah Thabane.

References

External links
Photo at cafe.daum.net/stade

Photo at worldstadiums.com
Photos at fussballtempel.net
Soccerway Profile

Football venues in Lesotho
Athletics (track and field) venues in Lesotho
Lesotho
Buildings and structures in Maseru
Multi-purpose stadiums